Stráž is a market town in Tachov District in the Plzeň Region of the Czech Republic. It has about 1,200 inhabitants.

Administrative parts
Villages of Bernartice, Bonětice, Bonětičky, Borek, Dehetná, Jadruž, Olešná, Souměř, Strachovice and Valcha are administrative parts of Stráž.

Notable people
Anton Gag (1859–1908), painter

References

Populated places in Tachov District
Market towns in the Czech Republic